The Wonder Twins (Zan & Jayna) are a fictional extraterrestrial twin brother and sister superhero duo who first appeared in Hanna-Barbera's American animated television series The All-New Super Friends Hour. The pair can activate their superpowers by touching their rings and saying the phrase "Wonder Twin powers, activate!" Jayna can transform into any animal, and Zan can become water in any state. The pair also have a pet monkey, Gleek, who assists in their crime-fighting activities.

They subsequently appeared in comics based on the animated series and were later introduced into the main DC Comics Universe. They have since appeared in other media, including the animated series Teen Titans Go! and the live-action TV series Smallville.

Broadcast and publication history
The duo made their debut in The All-New Super Friends Hour and then appeared in The World's Greatest Super Friends, Super Friends, and Super Friends: The Legendary Super Powers Show. Zan (voiced by Michael Bell) and Jayna (voiced by Louise Williams from 1977-1983 and B. J. Ward in 1984) are siblings from the planet Exxor (also spelled Exor) who were being informally trained by the superheroes. Unlike their predecessors, Wendy Harris and Marvin White, this pair was able to participate in combat with abilities of their own.

Hanna-Barbera animator Darrell McNeil recalls the twins were created by Norman Maurer, the Super Friends series developer/story editor. They were originally called Dick and Jane, and their sidekick was Mighty Monkey, before finally becoming Zan, Jayna, and Gleek. The names "Zan" and "Jayna" derived from the Edgar Rice Burroughs characters Tarzan and his romantic interest Jane. According to McNeil: "Originally Zan (Dick) had 'Plastic Man' powers and Jayna (Jane) could transform into anything, not just animals, but they were scaled back to their present powers as it made the other Super Friends (even Superman) seem almost superfluous". Jayna's distinctive hairdo was based on that of an animation checker at Hanna-Barbera, while the pointed ears were inspired by the character Spock from the Star Trek franchise. The twins' personalities were heavily based on Donny and Marie Osmond, who were extremely popular at the time and had their own show on ABC as well.

The Wonder Twins were the most prominently featured characters in their first season on Super Friends. However, by the final seasons, the twins were largely marginalized in favor of well established DC Comics teenage superheroes like Firestorm, and were wholly eliminated in the final season in favor of Cyborg.

The characters were introduced to comics in issue #7 of the Super Friends tie-in series (cover-dated October 1977, but published in July 1977), by E. Nelson Bridwell and Ramona Fradon. The Super Friends comic book provided considerably more details of the Wonder Twins' background and how they came to join the team than was provided in the television series. Because of the different production lag times between animation and comics, the first comic book appearance is chronologically before the first television appearance.

In the 1990s, they were introduced into the main DC Universe in Extreme Justice #9 (October 1995), by Ivan Velez, Jr. and Al Rio. The series rewrote and updated their origin story. Velez, an avowed die-hard fan of the Wonder Twins, intended to begin a revival of the characters, but was taken off the series after the first issue with the Wonder Twins. Though the twins remained with the series until its cancellation with #18, they were used only sparingly after Velez's departure. Following the cancellation of Extreme Justice, the Wonder Twins showed up only sporadically in the DC Universe, with their last significant appearance being in 2003.

DC published a six-issue Wonder Twins miniseries in 2019, written by Mark Russell and drawn by Stephen Byrne. The series was a critical and commercial success, and was extended into a 12 issue maxi-series.

In November 2019, the first 6 issues of "Wonder Twins" were collected as a trade paper back, and released under the title "Wonder Twins - Activate". In the following August, the second six issues of the maxi-series are being released in another trade paper back titled "The Fall & Rise of the Wonder Twins".

Fictional character biography

Super Friends
Little background is provided for the Wonder Twins in the Super Friends cartoon, save that they are superheroes-in-training that are friends of the Super Friends and were born on November 6.

According to the 1977 Super Friends comic book by writer E. Nelson Bridwell and artist Ramona Fradon, Zan and Jayna are Exxorian. The twins are metas, genetic throwbacks to an ancient race of Exxorian shapeshifters. Their parents died when they were still babies during a plague, and, because of their origin, no Exxorians want to adopt them. They are adopted by the owner of a Space Circus who only wants to use them as sideshow freaks. However, the circus' clown (or "laugh-maker") is a kind man and raises them. He also gives them Gleek as a pet. Eventually, as teens, the pair escapes the circus and hides on a planet where a space villain called Grax (an enemy of Superman) has established his headquarters. Spying on him, they learn that Grax is planning to destroy the Earth using hidden superbombs. The twins decide to travel to Earth and warn the Justice League, which is how they come to replace Wendy and Marvin (who were planning on retiring as heroes anyway) as their sidekicks. The heroes arrange for the kids to live with an old scientist named Professor Carter Nichols and they even take secret identities as Johan and Joanna Fleming. "Johan" and "Johanna" were supposedly transfer students from Esko, Sweden, disguised with blonde hair (Zan wore a wig, while Jayna used her powers to transform into a human to change her hair color and ear shape), to allow them to attend Gotham City High School.

According to the twins' self-titled 2019 series, Zan is older by three minutes.

In comics

In 1996, the twins were introduced into post-Crisis DC continuity in the series Extreme Justice as escaped slaves of an alien overlord. Unable to speak English, they inadvertently attack some civilians and the Justice League. During their fight with the JLA, Zan becomes an ice golem, a water monster, and a demonic-looking whirlpool, while Jayna becomes a griffin, a werewolf, and a sea serpent. The pair are later emancipated by the Justice League and join Captain Atom's team in issue #16 (May 1996). That same year, they appeared in the crossover storyline "Final Night" and in the series Total Justice.

In a 2002–2003 storyline by Peter David and Todd Nauck in Young Justice, they help avenge the murder of Empress' parents, wearing uniforms which resembled T-shirts and jeans. In late 2003, they appeared in the fourth issue of the Marvel-DC intercompany crossover miniseries JLA/Avengers, which was written by Kurt Busiek and illustrated by George Pérez.

In 2007, they appeared in Teen Titans vol. 3 #70, and in 2011, and in DCU: Legacies #9, a story by Len Wein and Rob Leigh.

In "Smallville: Titans", a story arc in the series Smallville season 11, Zan and Jayna are members of the team with Conner Kent/Superboy, Speedy, Blue Beetle and Miss Martian at Jay Garrick's school for the "gifted".

In the 2013 comic Justice League 3000, the handlers of the new Justice League who work for Cadmus Labs were introduced named Teri and Terry, and nicknamed The Wonder Twins.

In "Superpowers", a 2017 backup series in Cave Carson Has A Cybernetic Eye, cartoonist Tom Scioli offers a slightly different version of the origin of the Wonder Twins, set on an alternate Earth.

In February 2019, the first issue of a 6-issue mini-series was released on Wonder Comics, titled "Wonder Twins". It was well received and did so well in sales that it was expanded to a 12-issue maxi-series. The Wonder Comics imprint is considered part of the current DCU, so this places the Wonder Twins in current DC continuity. 

Later in September, the Wonder Twins had a cameo appearance in Action Comics #1015, which also guest starred new Wonder Comics hero Naomi. 

Wonder Comics appeared in the crossover storyline that begins in Young Justice vol. 3 #12, which features Naomi and the Wonder Twins as guest stars.  

The Wonder Twins appeared on the cover of Superman: Heroes #1.

Powers and abilities

The Wonder Twins' powers are activated when they touch each other and speak the phrase, "Wonder Twin powers, activate!" Physical contact is required. If the two are out of reach of each other, they are unable to activate their powers. As they are about to transform, they would each announce their intended form. "Shape of...", "Form of..."

Zan can transform into water at any state (solid, liquid, gas) and add to his mass by incorporating water in his immediate area. In the case of becoming solid ice, he can also become any form he chooses, from a  humanoid ice giant to a cage for a criminal to complex machinery (such as a jet engine, as he did in the episode "Eruption"). In the episode "Pressure Point", he changes into a gelatinous form. In "Terror from the Phantom Zone", he was able to transform into liquid nitrogen. In addition, he can transform himself into atmospheric disturbances (usually very localized) involving water, such as a blizzard, a monsoon, waterspout or a typhoon, as he did in the episodes "The Water Beast", "The Beasts are Coming", and "Stowaways".

Jayna can transform into any animal, whether real, mythological, indigenous to Earth, or indigenous to some other planet like Exxor. Since she must vocalize her choice of form to assume, she must know the common name. As revealed in "The Mummy of Nazca", naming the wrong animal will cause her to assume the wrong animal's form. She has been known to take the form of anything from a mosquito to a whale, as in "The Water Beast" episode.

In the Super Friends comic book, their powers were shown to be more extensive. By transforming into an animal of Kryptonian origin, for instance, Jayna could gain both the creature's natural abilities and the super-powers that all Kryptonians possess under Earth-like conditions; she was even capable of overpowering Superman in the form of a Kryptonian animal. Similarly, Zan was able to transform into anything tangentially related to water or ice, including a frost giant in the "Demons of Exxor" episode.

In addition to their powers of transformation, the two share a telepathic link, enabling one to alert the other over a distance when in dire circumstances, as revealed in the episode "The Village of Lost Souls".

The Wonder Twins have a pet Space Monkey named Gleek, who has a useful prehensile tail and who can act as a conduit for the twins to activate their powers should they be out of reach. Gleek also serves as a courier when the twins need to travel: Jayna will typically transform into a large eagle, and Zan will transform into water, "jumping" into a bucket which Gleek will hold while being clutched by Jayna in her eagle form.

A rarely seen aspect of their powers is the ability to break mind control. On at least two occasions ("Pied Piper From Space" and "Circus of Horrors"), while the twins were under the influence of mind control, Gleek caused them to make contact and the activation of their powers freed them instantly from the mind control.

In other media

Television

 Zan appears in the Harvey Birdman: Attorney at Law episode "Very Personal Injury", voiced by Michael Bell.
 A pair of characters inspired by the Wonder Twins called Downpour and Shifter appear in Justice League Unlimited, both voiced by Grey DeLisle. They are genetically-engineered superheroes created by Project Cadmus to serve as members of their Ultimen and operate independently of the Justice League, though the former group are led to believe that they are regular metahumans. In the episode "Ultimatum", the Ultimen discover the truth behind their creation and that they are suffering from cellular breakdown. They attack their manager Maxwell Lord in an attempt to find Cadmus member Amanda Waller, but are defeated by the League and taken back into Cadmus' custody. In the episode "Panic in the Sky", Cadmus utilizes an army of Ultimen clones in their siege on the League's Watchtower.
 Zan and Jayna appear in the Smallville episode "Idol", portrayed by David Gallagher and Allison Scagliotti respectively. This version of the pair are implied to be from another world and pass themselves off as humans of Swedish descent. Their origin is expanded upon in Smallville Season 11, where Zan and Jayna are shown to have been metahuman children on Earth who were evicted by their father for having powers.
 The Wonder Twins appear in the Teen Titans Go! episode "You're Fired", with Zan voiced by Khary Payton and Jayna by Tara Strong.

Film
 The Wonder Twins appear in The Lego Batman Movie.
 The Wonder Twins make a cameo appearance in Teen Titans Go! To the Movies.
 In February 2022, a DC Extended Universe film centered around the Wonder Twins was announced to be in development, with Adam Sztykiel writing and directing, in his directorial debut. Marty Bowen and Wyck Godfrey were reported as producers on the film, which would be a joint-venture production between DC Films, Temple Hill Entertainment, and HBO Original Films and star KJ Apa and Isabel May as Zan and Jayna. The film was developed with an intended streaming release, exclusively through HBO Max, though it was later canceled due to budget cuts at Warner Bros. Discovery.

Video games
The Teen Titans Go! incarnations of the Wonder Twins appear in Lego Dimensions. Additionally, The Lego Batman Movie incarnations make cameo appearances in the film's eponymous DLC pack.

Miscellaneous
 The Wonder Twins appear in the Adult Swim web series The New Adventures of the Wonder Twins. This version of the pair are well-meaning but inept superheroes whose attempts at heroism always end in tragic failure.
 Jayna appears in the Family Guy episode "Fast Times at Buddy Cianci Jr. High", voiced by Rachael MacFarlane. Additionally, it is revealed Peter Griffin was once a member of the Wonder Twins.

References

External links

2019 comics debuts
Animated duos
DC Comics aliens
DC Comics characters who are shapeshifters
DC Comics female superheroes
DC Comics male superheroes
DC Comics superheroes
DC Comics extraterrestrial superheroes
Female characters in animation
Male characters in television
Fictional characters with ice or cold abilities
Fictional characters with water abilities
Clone characters in comics
Fictional duos
Extraterrestrial characters in television
Fictional humanoids
Fictional therianthropes
Twin characters in comics
Hanna-Barbera characters
Super Friends characters
Superhero duos
Superheroes who are adopted
Television characters introduced in 1977
Television duos